Kyle Yousaf (born 28 June 1993) is a British professional boxer who held the English flyweight title in 2018.

Professional career
Yousaf made his professional debut on 21 May 2015, scoring a four-round points decision (PTS) victory over Anwar Alfadli at the Octagon Centre in Sheffield, England. He fought another four times in 2015; PTS wins over Stefan Slavchev in March and Mikheil Soloninkini in April; and technical knockout (TKO) wins over Khvicha Gigolashvili in May and Gary Reeve in October.

He secured another five wins in 2016; Sergey Tasimov and Jose Aguilar by PTS in February and April respectively; Robert Kanalas in May, Gyula Dodu in September and Felix Moncada in December, all by TKO.

Following three PTS wins–Louis Norman in May 2017; Brett Fidoe in November; and Isaac Quaye in February 2018–Yousaf fought for his first professional title against Conar Blackshaw on 5 October 2018 at the Barnsley Metrodome in Barnsley. Yousaf won via sixth-round corner retirement (RTD) to capture the English flyweight title.

He secured two more wins in 2019; Steven Maguire by TKO in March and Ricky Leach by PTS in November.

Professional boxing record

References

Living people
1993 births
British male boxers
Sportspeople from Sheffield
Flyweight boxers
Bantamweight boxers